

Events

Pre-1600
30 BC – Octavian (later known as Augustus) enters Alexandria, Egypt, bringing it under the control of the Roman Republic.
AD 69 – Batavian rebellion: The Batavians in Germania Inferior (Netherlands) revolt under the leadership of Gaius Julius Civilis.
 527 – Justinian I becomes the sole ruler of the Byzantine Empire.
 607 – Ono no Imoko is dispatched as envoy to the Sui court in China (Traditional Japanese date: July 3, 607).
 902 – Taormina, the last Byzantine stronghold in Sicily, is captured by the Aghlabid army, concluding the Muslim conquest of Sicily.
1203 – Isaac II Angelos, restored Byzantine Emperor, declares his son Alexios IV Angelos co-emperor after pressure from the forces of the Fourth Crusade.
1291 – The Old Swiss Confederacy is formed with the signature of the Federal Charter.
1469 – Louis XI of France founds the chivalric order called the Order of Saint Michael in Amboise.
1498 – Christopher Columbus becomes the first European to visit what is now Venezuela.
1571 – The Ottoman conquest of Cyprus is concluded, by the surrender of Famagusta.

1601–1900
1620 – Speedwell leaves Delfshaven to bring pilgrims to America by way of England.
1664 – Ottoman forces are defeated in the battle of Saint Gotthard by an Austrian army led by Raimondo Montecuccoli, resulting in the Peace of Vasvár.
1714 – George, Elector of Hanover, becomes King George I of Great Britain, marking the beginning of the Georgian era of British history.
1759 – Seven Years' War: The Battle of Minden, an allied Anglo-German army victory over the French. In Britain this was one of a number of events that constituted the Annus Mirabilis of 1759 and is celebrated as Minden Day by certain British Army regiments.
1774 – British scientist Joseph Priestley discovers oxygen gas, corroborating the prior discovery of this element by German-Swedish chemist Carl Wilhelm Scheele.
1798 – French Revolutionary Wars: Battle of the Nile (Battle of Aboukir Bay): Battle begins when a British fleet engages the French Revolutionary Navy fleet in an unusual night action.
1800 – The Acts of Union 1800 are passed which merge the Kingdom of Great Britain and the Kingdom of Ireland into the United Kingdom of Great Britain and Ireland.
1801 – First Barbary War: The American schooner  captures the Tripolitan polacca Tripoli in a single-ship action off the coast of modern-day Libya.
1834 – Slavery is abolished in the British Empire as the Slavery Abolition Act 1833 comes into force, although it remains legal in the possessions of the East India Company until the passage of the Indian Slavery Act, 1843.
  1834   – Construction begins on the Wilberforce Monument in Kingston Upon Hull.
1842 – The Lombard Street riot erupts in Philadelphia, Pennsylvania, United States.
1849 – Joven Daniel wrecks at the coast of Araucanía, Chile, leading to allegations that local Mapuche tribes murdered survivors and kidnapped Elisa Bravo.
1855 – The first ascent of Monte Rosa, the second highest summit in the Alps.
1863 – At the suggestion of Senator J. V. Snellman and the order of Emperor Alexander II, full rights were promised to the Finnish language by a language regulation in the Grand Duchy of Finland.
1876 – Colorado is admitted as the 38th U.S. state.
1893 – Henry Perky patents shredded wheat.
1894 – The Empire of Japan and Qing China declare war on each other after a week of fighting over Korea, formally inaugurating the First Sino-Japanese War.

1901–present
1907 – The start of the first Scout camp on Brownsea Island, the origin of the worldwide Scouting movement.
1911 – Harriet Quimby takes her pilot's test and becomes the first U.S. woman to earn an Aero Club of America aviator's certificate.
1914 – The German Empire declares war on the Russian Empire at the opening of World War I. The Swiss Army mobilizes because of World War I.
1927 – The Nanchang Uprising marks the first significant battle in the Chinese Civil War between the Kuomintang and Chinese Communist Party. This day is commemorated as the anniversary of the founding of the People's Liberation Army.
1933 – Anti-Fascist activists Bruno Tesch, Walter Möller, Karl Wolff and August Lütgens are executed by the Nazi regime in Altona.
1936 – The Olympics opened in Berlin with a ceremony presided over by Adolf Hitler.
1937 – Josip Broz Tito reads the resolution "Manifesto of constitutional congress of KPH" to the constitutive congress of KPH (Croatian Communist Party) in woods near Samobor.
1943 – World War II: Operation Tidal Wave also known as "Black Sunday", was a failed American attempt to destroy Romanian oil fields.
1944 – World War II: The Warsaw Uprising against the Nazi German occupation breaks out in Warsaw, Poland.
1946 – Leaders of the Russian Liberation Army, a force of Russian prisoners of war that collaborated with Nazi Germany, are executed in Moscow, Soviet Union for treason.
1950 – Guam is organized as an unincorporated territory of the United States as the President Harry S. Truman signs the Guam Organic Act.
1957 – The United States and Canada form the North American Aerospace Defense Command (NORAD).
1960 – Dahomey (later renamed Benin) declares independence from France.
1960 – Islamabad is declared the federal capital of the Government of Pakistan.
1961 – U.S. Defense Secretary Robert McNamara orders the creation of the Defense Intelligence Agency (DIA), the nation's first centralized military espionage organization.
1964 – The former Belgian Congo is renamed the Democratic Republic of the Congo.
1965 – Frank Herbert's novel, Dune was published for the first time.  It was named as the world's best-selling science fiction novel in 2003.
1966 – Charles Whitman kills 16 people at the University of Texas at Austin before being killed by the police.
  1966   – Purges of intellectuals and imperialists becomes official China policy at the beginning of the Cultural Revolution.
1968 – The coronation is held of Hassanal Bolkiah, the 29th Sultan of Brunei.
1971 – The Concert for Bangladesh, organized by former Beatle George Harrison, is held at Madison Square Garden in New York City.
1974 – Cyprus dispute: The United Nations Security Council authorizes the UNFICYP to create the "Green Line", dividing Cyprus into two zones.
1976 – Niki Lauda has a severe accident that almost claims his life at the German Grand Prix at Nurburgring.
1980 – Vigdís Finnbogadóttir is elected President of Iceland and becomes the world's first democratically elected female head of state.
  1980   – A train crash kills 18 people in County Cork, Ireland.
1981 – MTV begins broadcasting in the United States and airs its first video, "Video Killed the Radio Star" by The Buggles.
1984 – Commercial peat-cutters discover the preserved bog body of a man, called Lindow Man, at Lindow Moss, Cheshire, England.
1988 – A British soldier was killed in the Inglis Barracks bombing in London, England.
1993 – The Great Mississippi and Missouri Rivers Flood of 1993 comes to a peak.
2004 – A supermarket fire kills 396 people and injures 500 others in Asunción, Paraguay.
2007 – The I-35W Mississippi River bridge spanning the Mississippi River in Minneapolis, Minnesota, collapses during the evening rush hour, killing 13 people and injuring 145.
2008 – The Beijing–Tianjin Intercity Railway begins operation as the fastest commuter rail system in the world.
  2008   – Eleven mountaineers from international expeditions died on K2, the second-highest mountain on Earth in the worst single accident in the history of K2 mountaineering.
2017 – A suicide attack on a mosque in Herat, Afghanistan kills 20 people.

Births

Pre-1600
10 BC – Claudius, Roman emperor (d. 54)
126 – Pertinax, Roman emperor (d. 193)
 845 – Sugawara no Michizane, Japanese scholar and politician (d. 903)
 992 – Hyeonjong of Goryeo, Korean king (d. 1031)
1068 – Emperor Taizu of Jin, Chinese emperor (d. 1123)
1313 – Kōgon, Japanese emperor (d. 1364)
1377 – Go-Komatsu, Japanese emperor (d. 1433)
1385 – John FitzAlan, 13th Earl of Arundel (d. 1421)
1410 – John IV, Count of Nassau-Siegen, German count (d. 1475)
1492 – Wolfgang, Prince of Anhalt-Köthen, German prince (d. 1566)
1520 – Sigismund II, Polish king (d. 1572)
1545 – Andrew Melville, Scottish theologian and scholar (d. 1622)
1555 – Edward Kelley, English spirit medium (d. 1597)
1579 – Luis Vélez de Guevara, Spanish author and playwright (d. 1644)

1601–1900
1626 – Sabbatai Zevi, Montenegrin rabbi and theorist (d. 1676)
1630 – Thomas Clifford, 1st Baron Clifford of Chudleigh, English politician, Lord High Treasurer (d. 1673)
1659 – Sebastiano Ricci, Italian painter (d. 1734)
1713 – Charles I, German duke and prince (d. 1780)
1714 – Richard Wilson, Welsh painter and academic (d. 1782)
1738 – Jacques François Dugommier, French general (d. 1794)
1744 – Jean-Baptiste Lamarck, French soldier, biologist, and academic (d. 1829)
1770 – William Clark, American soldier, explorer, and politician, 4th Governor of Missouri Territory (d. 1838)
1779 – Francis Scott Key, American lawyer, author, and poet (d. 1843)
  1779   – Lorenz Oken, German-Swiss botanist, biologist, and ornithologist (d. 1851)
1809 – William B. Travis, American colonel and lawyer (d. 1836)
1815 – Richard Henry Dana, Jr., American lawyer and politician (d. 1882)
1818 – Maria Mitchell, American astronomer and academic (d. 1889)
1819 – Herman Melville, American novelist, short story writer, and poet (d. 1891)
1831 – Antonio Cotogni, Italian opera singer and educator (d. 1918)
1843 – Robert Todd Lincoln, American lawyer and politician, 35th United States Secretary of War (d. 1926)
1856 – George Coulthard, Australian footballer and cricketer (d. 1883)
1858 – Gaston Doumergue, French lawyer and politician, 13th President of France (d. 1937)
  1858   – Hans Rott, Austrian organist and composer (d. 1884)
1860 – Bazil Assan, Romanian engineer and explorer (d. 1918)
1861 – Sammy Jones, Australian cricketer (d. 1951)
1865 – Isobel Lilian Gloag, English painter (d. 1917)
1871 – John Lester, American cricketer and soccer player (d. 1969)
1877 – George Hackenschmidt, Estonian-English wrestler and strongman (d. 1968)
1878 – Konstantinos Logothetopoulos, Greek physician and politician, Prime Minister of Greece (d. 1961)
1881 – Otto Toeplitz, German mathematician and academic (d. 1940)
1885 – George de Hevesy, Hungarian-German chemist and academic, Nobel Prize laureate (d. 1966)
1889 – Walter Gerlach, German physicist and academic (d. 1979)
1891 – Karl Kobelt, Swiss lawyer and politician, 52nd President of the Swiss Confederation (d. 1968)
1893 – Alexander of Greece (d. 1920)
1894 – Ottavio Bottecchia, Italian cyclist (d. 1927)
1898 – Morris Stoloff, American composer and musical director (d. 1980) 
1899 – Raymond Mays, English race car driver and businessman (d. 1980)
1900 – Otto Nothling, Australian cricketer and rugby player (d. 1965)

1901–present
1901 – Francisco Guilledo, Filipino boxer (d. 1925)
1903 – Paul Horgan, American historian, author, and academic (d. 1995)
1905 – Helen Sawyer Hogg, American-Canadian astronomer and academic (d. 1993)
1907 – Eric Shipton, Sri Lankan-English mountaineer and explorer (d. 1977)
1910 – James Henry Govier, English painter and illustrator (d. 1974)
  1910   – Walter Scharf, American pianist and composer (d. 2003)
  1910   – Gerda Taro, German war photographer (d. 1937)
1911 – Jackie Ormes, American journalist and cartoonist (d. 1985)
1912 – David Brand, Australian politician, 19th Premier of Western Australia (d. 1979)
  1912   – Gego, German-Venezuelan sculptor and academic (d. 1994)
  1912   – Henry Jones, American actor (d. 1999)
1914 – Jack Delano, American photographer and composer (d. 1997)
  1914   – Alan Moore, Australian painter and educator (d. 2015)
  1914   – J. Lee Thompson, English-Canadian director, producer, and screenwriter (d. 2002)
1916 – Fiorenzo Angelini, Italian cardinal (d. 2014)
  1916   – Anne Hébert, Canadian author and poet (d. 2000)
1918 – T. J. Jemison, American minister and activist (d. 2013)
1919 – Stanley Middleton, English author (d. 2009) 
1920 – Raul Renter, Estonian economist and chess player (d. 1992)
1921 – Jack Kramer, American tennis player, sailor, and sportscaster (d. 2009)
  1921   – Pat McDonald, Australian actress (d. 1990)
1922 – Arthur Hill, Canadian-American actor (d. 2006)
1924 – Abdullah of Saudi Arabia (d. 2015)
  1924   – Frank Havens, American canoeist (d. 2018)
  1924   – Marcia Mae Jones, American actress and singer (d. 2007)
  1924   – Frank Worrell, Barbadian cricketer (d. 1967)
1925 – Ernst Jandl, Austrian poet and author (d. 2000)
1926 – George Hauptfuhrer, American basketball player and lawyer (d. 2013)
  1926   – Hannah Hauxwell, English TV personality (d. 2018)
1927 – María Teresa López Boegeholz, Chilean oceanographer (d. 2006)
  1927   – Anthony G. Bosco, American bishop (d. 2013)
1928 – Jack Shea, American director, producer, and screenwriter (d. 2013)
1929 – Hafizullah Amin, Afghan educator and politician, Afghan Minister of Foreign Affairs (d. 1979)
  1929   – Ann Calvello, American roller derby racer (d. 2006)
  1929   – Leila Abashidze, Georgian actress (d. 2018)
1930 – Lionel Bart, English composer (d. 1999)
  1930   – Pierre Bourdieu, French sociologist, anthropologist, and philosopher (d. 2002)
  1930   – Julie Bovasso, American actress and writer (d. 1991)
  1930   – Lawrence Eagleburger, American lieutenant and politician, 62nd United States Secretary of State (d. 2011)
  1930   – Károly Grósz, Hungarian politician, 51st Prime Minister of Hungary (d. 1996)
  1930   – Geoffrey Holder, Trinidadian-American actor, singer, dancer, and choreographer (d. 2014)
1931 – Ramblin' Jack Elliott, American singer-songwriter and guitarist
  1931   – Trevor Goddard, South African cricketer (d. 2016)
1932 – Meir Kahane, American-Israeli rabbi and activist, founded the Jewish Defense League (d. 1990)
1933 – Dom DeLuise, American actor, singer, director, and producer (d. 2009)
  1933   – Masaichi Kaneda, Japanese baseball player and manager (d. 2019)
  1933   – Meena Kumari, Indian actress (d. 1972)
  1933   – Teri Shields, American actress, producer, and agent (d. 2012)
  1933   – Dušan Třeštík, Czech historian and author (d. 2007)
1934 – John Beck, New Zealand cricketer (d. 2000)
  1934   – Derek Birdsall, English graphic designer
1935 – Geoff Pullar, English cricketer (d. 2014)
1936 – W. D. Hamilton, Egyptian born British biologist, psychologist, and academic (d. 2000)
  1936   – Yves Saint Laurent, Algerian-French fashion designer, co-founded Yves Saint Laurent (d. 2008)
  1936   – Laurie Taylor, English sociologist, radio host, and academic
1937 – Al D'Amato, American lawyer and politician
1939 – Bob Frankford, English-Canadian physician and politician (d. 2015)
  1939   – Terry Kiser, American actor
  1939   – Stephen Sykes, English bishop and theologian (d. 2014)
  1939   – Robert James Waller, American author and photographer (d. 2017)
1940 – Mervyn Kitchen, English cricketer and umpire
  1940   – Henry Silverman, American businessman, founded Cendant
  1940   – Mahmoud Dowlatabadi, Iranian writer and actor
1941 – Ron Brown, American captain and politician, 30th United States Secretary of Commerce (d. 1996)
  1941   – Étienne Roda-Gil, French songwriter and screenwriter (d. 2004)
1942 – Jerry Garcia, American singer-songwriter and guitarist (d. 1995)
  1942   – Giancarlo Giannini, Italian actor, director, producer, and screenwriter
1944 – Dmitry Nikolayevich Filippov, Russian banker and politician (d. 1998)
1945 – Douglas Osheroff, American physicist and academic, Nobel Prize laureate
1946 – Boz Burrell, English singer-songwriter, bass player, and guitarist (d. 2006)
  1946   – Rick Coonce, American drummer (d. 2011)
  1946   – Richard O. Covey, American colonel, pilot, and astronaut
  1946   – Fiona Stanley, Australian epidemiologist and academic
1947 – Lorna Goodison, Jamaican poet and author
  1947   – Chantal Montellier, French comics creator and artist
1948 – Avi Arad, Israeli-American screenwriter and producer, founded Marvel Studios
  1948   – Cliff Branch, American football player (d. 2019)
  1948   – David Gemmell, English journalist and author (d. 2006)
1949 – Kurmanbek Bakiyev, Kyrgyzstani politician, 2nd President of Kyrgyzstan
  1949   – Jim Carroll, American poet, author, and musician (d. 2009)
  1949   – Ray Nettles, American football player (d. 2009)
1950 – Roy Williams, American basketball player and coach
1951 – Tim Bachman, Canadian singer-songwriter and guitarist 
  1951   – Tommy Bolin, American singer-songwriter and guitarist (d. 1976)
  1951   – Pete Mackanin, American baseball player, coach, and manager
1952 – Zoran Đinđić, Serbian philosopher and politician, 6th Prime Minister of Serbia (d. 2003)
1953 – Robert Cray, American blues singer-songwriter and guitarist
  1953   – Howard Kurtz, American journalist and author
1954 – Trevor Berbick, Jamaican-Canadian boxer (d. 2006)
  1954   – James Gleick, American journalist and author
  1954   – Benno Möhlmann, German footballer and manager
1957 – Anne-Marie Hutchinson, British lawyer (d. 2020)
  1957   – Taylor Negron, American actor and screenwriter (d. 2015)
1958 – Rob Buck, American guitarist and songwriter (d. 2000)
  1958   – Michael Penn, American singer-songwriter and guitarist 
  1958   – Kiki Vandeweghe, American basketball player and coach
1959 – Joe Elliott, English singer-songwriter, guitarist, and producer 
1960 – Chuck D, American rapper and songwriter
  1960   – Suzi Gardner, American rock singer-songwriter and guitarist
1962 – Jacob Matlala, South African boxer (d. 2013)
1963 – Demián Bichir, Mexican-American actor and producer
  1963   – Coolio, American rapper, producer, and actor (d. 2022)
  1963   – John Carroll Lynch, American actor
  1963   – Koichi Wakata, Japanese astronaut and engineer
  1963   – Dean Wareham, New Zealand singer-songwriter and guitarist 
1964 – Adam Duritz, American singer-songwriter and producer
  1964   – Fiona Hyslop, Scottish businesswoman and politician
  1964   – Augusta Read Thomas, American composer, conductor and educator
1965 – Brandt Jobe, American golfer
  1965   – Sam Mendes, English director and producer
1966 – James St. James, American club promoter and author
1967 – Gregg Jefferies, American baseball player and coach
  1967   – José Padilha, Brazilian director, producer and screenwriter
1968 – Stacey Augmon, American basketball player and coach
  1968   – Dan Donegan, American heavy metal guitarist and songwriter
  1968   – Shigetoshi Hasegawa, Japanese baseball player and sportscaster
1969 – Andrei Borissov, Estonian footballer and manager
  1969   – Kevin Jarvis, American baseball player and scout
  1969   – Graham Thorpe, English cricketer and journalist
1970 – Quentin Coryatt, American football player
  1970   – David James, English footballer and manager
  1970   – Eugenie van Leeuwen, Dutch cricketer
1972 – Nicke Andersson, Swedish singer-songwriter and guitarist 
  1972   – Christer Basma, Norwegian footballer and coach
  1972   – Todd Bouman, American football player and coach
  1972   – Thomas Woods, American historian, economist, and academic
1973 – Gregg Berhalter, American soccer player and coach
  1973   – Veerle Dejaeghere, Belgian runner
  1973   – Edurne Pasaban, Spanish mountaineer
1974 – Cher Calvin, American journalist 
  1974   – Marek Galiński, Polish cyclist (d. 2014)
  1974   – Tyron Henderson, South African cricketer
  1974   – Dennis Lawrence, Trinidadian footballer and coach
  1974   – Beckie Scott, Canadian skier
1975 – Vhrsti, Czech author and illustrator
1976 – Don Hertzfeldt, American animator, producer, screenwriter, and voice actor
  1976   – Søren Jochumsen, Danish footballer
  1976   – Nwankwo Kanu, Nigerian footballer
  1976   – David Nemirovsky, Canadian ice hockey player
  1976   – Hasan Şaş, Turkish footballer and manager
  1976   – Cristian Stoica, Romanian-Italian rugby player
1977 – Marc Denis, Canadian ice hockey player and sportscaster
  1977   – Haspop, French-Moroccan dancer, choreographer, and actor
  1977   – Darnerien McCants, American-Canadian football player
  1977   – Damien Saez, French singer-songwriter and guitarist
  1977   – Yoshi Tatsu, Japanese wrestler and boxer
1978 – Andy Blignaut, Zimbabwean cricketer
  1978   – Björn Ferry, Swedish biathlete
  1978   – Dhani Harrison, English singer-songwriter and guitarist 
  1978   – Chris Iwelumo, Scottish footballer
  1978   – Edgerrin James, American football player
1979 – Junior Agogo, Ghanaian footballer (d. 2019)
  1979   – Nathan Fien, Australian-New Zealand rugby league player
  1979   – Jason Momoa, American actor, director, and producer
1980 – Mancini, Brazilian footballer
  1980   – Romain Barras, French decathlete
  1980   – Esteban Paredes, Chilean footballer
1981 – Dean Cox, Australian footballer
  1981   – Pia Haraldsen, Norwegian journalist and author
  1981   – Christofer Heimeroth, German footballer
  1981   – Stephen Hunt, Irish footballer
  1981   – Jamie Jones-Buchanan, English rugby player
1982 – Basem Fathi, Jordanian footballer
  1982   – Montserrat Lombard, English actress, director, and screenwriter
1983 – Bobby Carpenter, American football player
  1983   – Craig Clarke, New Zealand rugby player
  1983   – Julien Faubert, French footballer
  1983   – David Gervasi, Swiss decathlete
1984 – Steve Feak, American game designer
  1984   – Francesco Gavazzi, Italian cyclist
  1984   – Brandon Kintzler, American baseball player
  1984   – Bastian Schweinsteiger, German footballer
1985 – Stuart Holden, Scottish-American soccer player
  1985   – Adam Jones, American baseball player
  1985   – Cole Kimball, American baseball player
  1985   – Tendai Mtawarira, South African rugby player
  1985   – Kris Stadsgaard, Danish footballer
  1985   – Dušan Švento, Slovak footballer
1986 – Damien Allen, English footballer
  1986   – Anton Strålman, Swedish ice hockey player
  1986   – Andrew Taylor, English footballer
  1986   – Elena Vesnina, Russian tennis player
  1986   – Mike Wallace, American football player
1987 – Iago Aspas, Spanish footballer 
  1987   – Karen Carney, English women's footballer
  1987   – Sébastien Pocognoli, Belgian footballer
  1987   – Lee Wallace, Scottish footballer
  1987   – Taapsee Pannu, Indian actress
1988 – Mustafa Abdellaoue, Norwegian footballer
  1988   – Nemanja Matić, Serbian footballer
  1988   – Patryk Małecki, Polish footballer
  1988   – Bodene Thompson, New Zealand rugby league player
1989 – Madison Bumgarner, American baseball player
  1989   – Tiffany Hwang, Korean American singer, songwriter, and actress
1990 – Aledmys Díaz, Cuban baseball player
  1990   – Elton Jantjies, South African rugby player
1991 – Piotr Malarczyk, Polish footballer
  1991   – Marco Puntoriere, Italian footballer
1992 – Austin Rivers, American basketball player
  1992   – Mrunal Thakur, Indian actress
1993 – Álex Abrines, Spanish basketball player
  1993   – Leon Thomas III, American actor and singer
1994 – Sergeal Petersen, South African rugby player
  1994   – Ayaka Wada, Japanese singer 
1995 – Madison Cawthorn, American politician
1996 – Katie Boulter, British tennis player
2001 – Park Si-eun, South Korean actress
  2001   – Ben Trbojevic, Australian rugby league player
2003 – Joseph Sua'ali'i, Australian-Samoan rugby league player

Deaths

Pre-1600
30 BC – Mark Antony, Roman general and politician (b. 83 BC)
 371 – Eusebius of Vercelli, Italian bishop and saint (b. 283)
 527 – Justin I, Byzantine emperor (b. 450)
 690s – Jonatus, abbot and saint
 873 – Thachulf, duke of Thuringia
 946 – Ali ibn Isa al-Jarrah, Abbasid vizier (b. 859)
   946   – Lady Xu Xinyue, Chinese queen (b. 902)
 953 – Yingtian, Chinese Khitan empress (b. 879)
 984 – Æthelwold, bishop of Winchester 
1098 – Adhemar of Le Puy, French papal legate
1137 – Louis VI, king of France (b. 1081)
1146 – Vsevolod II of Kiev, Russian prince
1227 – Shimazu Tadahisa, Japanese warlord (b. 1179)
1252 – Giovanni da Pian del Carpine, Italian archbishop and explorer (b. 1180)
1299 – Conrad de Lichtenberg, Bishop of Strasbourg (b. 1240)
1402 – Edmund of Langley, 1st Duke of York, English politician, Lord Warden of the Cinque Ports (b. 1341)
1457 – Lorenzo Valla, Italian author and educator (b. 1406)
1464 – Cosimo de' Medici, Italian ruler (b. 1386)
1494 – Giovanni Santi, artist and father of Raphael (b. c. 1435)
1541 – Simon Grynaeus, German theologian and scholar (b. 1493)
1543 – Magnus I, Duke of Saxe-Lauenburg (b. 1488)
1546 – Peter Faber, French Jesuit theologian (b. 1506)
1557 – Olaus Magnus, Swedish archbishop, historian, and cartographer (b. 1490)
1580 – Albrecht Giese, Polish-German politician and diplomat (b. 1524)
1589 – Jacques Clément, French assassin of Henry III of France (b. 1567)

1601–1900
1603 – Matthew Browne, English politician (b. 1563)
1714 – Anne, Queen of Great Britain (b. 1665)
1787 – Alphonsus Maria de' Liguori, Italian bishop and saint (b. 1696)
1795 – Clas Bjerkander, Swedish meteorologist, botanist, and entomologist (b. 1735)
1796 – Sir Robert Pigot, 2nd Baronet, English colonel and politician (b. 1720)
1797 – Emanuel Granberg, Finnish church painter (b. 1754)
1798 – François-Paul Brueys d'Aigalliers, French admiral (b. 1753)
1807 – John Boorman, English cricketer (b. c. 1754)
  1807   – John Walker, English actor, philologist, and lexicographer (b. 1732)
1808 – Lady Diana Beauclerk, English painter and illustrator (b. 1734)
1812 – Yakov Kulnev, Russian general (b. 1763)
1851 – William Joseph Behr, German publicist and academic (b. 1775)
1863 – Jind Kaur Majarani (Regent) of the Sikh Empire (b. 1817)
1866 – John Ross, American tribal chief (b. 1790)
1869 – Peter Julian Eymard, French Priest and Founder Congregation of the Blessed Sacrament (b. 1811)
1869 – Richard Dry, Australian politician, 7th Premier of Tasmania (b. 1815)

1901–present
1903 – Calamity Jane, American frontierswoman and scout (b. 1853)
1911 – Edwin Austin Abbey, American painter and illustrator (b. 1852)
  1911   – Samuel Arza Davenport, American lawyer and politician (b. 1843)
1918 – John Riley Banister, American cowboy and police officer (b. 1854)
1920 – Bal Gangadhar Tilak, Indian freedom fighter, lawyer and journalist (b. 1856)
1921 – T.J. Ryan, Australian politician, 19th Premier of Queensland (b. 1876)
1922 – Donát Bánki, Hungarian engineer (b. 1856)
1929 – Syd Gregory, Australian cricketer (b. 1870)
1938 – Edmund C. Tarbell, American painter and academic (b. 1862)
1943 – Lydia Litvyak, Russian lieutenant and pilot (b. 1921)
1944 – Manuel L. Quezon, Filipino soldier, lawyer, and politician, 2nd President of the Philippines (b. 1878)
1957 – Rose Fyleman, English writer and poet (b. 1877)
1959 – Jean Behra, French race car driver (b. 1921)
1963 – Theodore Roethke, American poet (b. 1908)
1966 – Charles Whitman, American murderer (b. 1941)
1967 – Richard Kuhn, Austrian-German biochemist and academic, Nobel Prize Laureate (b. 1900)
1970 – Frances Farmer, American actress (b. 1913)
  1970   – Doris Fleeson, American journalist (b. 1901)
  1970   – Otto Heinrich Warburg, German physician and physiologist, Nobel Prize laureate (b. 1883)
1973 – Gian Francesco Malipiero, Italian composer and educator (b. 1882)
  1973   – Walter Ulbricht, German soldier and politician (b. 1893)
1974 – Ildebrando Antoniutti, Italian cardinal (b. 1898)
1977 – Francis Gary Powers, American captain and pilot (b. 1929)
1980 – Patrick Depailler, French race car driver (b. 1944)
  1980   – Strother Martin, American actor (b. 1919)
1981 – Paddy Chayefsky, American author, playwright, and screenwriter (b. 1923)
  1981   – Kevin Lynch, Irish Republican
1982 – T. Thirunavukarasu, Sri Lankan lawyer and politician (b. 1933)
1989 – John Ogdon, English pianist and composer (b. 1937)
1990 – Norbert Elias, German-Dutch sociologist, author, and academic (b. 1897)
1996 – Tadeusz Reichstein, Polish-Swiss chemist and academic, Nobel Prize laureate (b. 1897)
  1996   – Lucille Teasdale-Corti, Canadian physician and surgeon (b. 1929)
1998 – Eva Bartok, Hungarian-British actress (b. 1927)
2001 – Korey Stringer, American football player (b. 1974)
2003 – Guy Thys, Belgian footballer, coach, and manager (b. 1922)
  2003   – Marie Trintignant, French actress and screenwriter (b. 1962)
2004 – Philip Abelson, American physicist and author (b. 1913)
2005 – Al Aronowitz, American journalist (b. 1928)
  2005   – Wim Boost, Dutch cartoonist and educator (b. 1918)
  2005   – Constant Nieuwenhuys, Dutch painter and sculptor (b. 1920)
  2005   – Fahd of Saudi Arabia (b. 1923)
2006 – Bob Thaves, American illustrator (b. 1924)
  2006   – Iris Marion Young, American political scientist and activist (b. 1949)
2007 – Tommy Makem, Irish singer-songwriter and banjo player (b. 1932)
2008 – Gertan Klauber, Czech-English actor (b. 1932)
  2008   – Harkishan Singh Surjeet, Indian lawyer and politician (b. 1916)
2009 – Corazon Aquino, Filipino politician, 11th President of the Philippines (b. 1933)
2010 – Lolita Lebrón, Puerto Rican-American activist (b. 1919)
  2010   – Eric Tindill, New Zealand rugby player and cricketer (b. 1910)
2012 – Aldo Maldera, Italian footballer and agent (b. 1953)
  2012   – Douglas Townsend, American composer and musicologist (b. 1921)
  2012   – Barry Trapnell, English cricketer and academic (b. 1924)
2013 – John Amis, English journalist and critic (b. 1922)
  2013   – Gail Kobe, American actress and producer (b. 1932)
  2013   – Babe Martin, American baseball player (b. 1920)
  2013   – Toby Saks, American cellist and educator (b. 1942)
  2013   – Wilford White, American football player (b. 1928)
2014 – Valyantsin Byalkevich, Belarusian footballer and manager (b. 1973)
  2014   – Jan Roar Leikvoll, Norwegian author (b. 1974)
  2014   – Charles T. Payne, American soldier (b. 1925)
  2014   – Mike Smith, English radio and television host (b. 1955)
2015 – Stephan Beckenbauer, German footballer and manager (b. 1968)
  2015   – Cilla Black, English singer and actress (b. 1943)
  2015   – Bernard d'Espagnat, French physicist, philosopher, and author (b. 1921)
  2015   – Bob Frankford, English-Canadian physician and politician (b. 1939)
  2015   – Hong Yuanshuo, Chinese footballer and manager (b. 1948)
2016 – Queen Anne of Romania (b. 1923)
2020 – Wilford Brimley, American actor and singer (b. 1934)
  2020   – Rodney H. Pardey, American poker player (b. 1945)
  2020   – Rickey Dixon, American professional football player (b. 1966)
2021 – Abdalqadir as-Sufi, Scottish Islamic scholar and writer (b. 1930)
  2021   – Jerry Ziesmer, American assistant director, production manager and occasional actor (b. 1939)

Holidays and observances
Armed Forces Day (Lebanon)
Armed Forces Day (China) or Anniversary of the Founding of the People's Liberation Army (People's Republic of China)
Azerbaijani Language and Alphabet Day (Azerbaijan)
Emancipation Day is commemorated in many parts of the former British Empire, which marks the day the Slavery Abolition Act 1833 came into effect which abolished chattel slavery in the British Empire:
Emancipation Day is a public holiday in Barbados, Bermuda, Guyana, Jamaica, Saint Vincent and the Grenadines, Trinidad and Tobago
Earliest day on which Emancipation Day can fall, where it is commemorated on the first Monday of August, for example in Anguilla, the Bahamas, British Virgin Islands
Earliest day on which Caribana carnival can fall, takes place on the first Weekend of August. (Toronto)
Christian feast day:
Abgar V of Edessa (Syrian Church)
Alphonsus Maria de' Liguori
Æthelwold of Winchester
Bernard Võ Văn Duệ (one of Vietnamese Martyrs)
Blessed Gerhard Hirschfelder
Eusebius of Vercelli
Exuperius of Bayeux
Felix of Girona
Peter Apostle in Chains
Procession of the Cross and the beginning of Dormition Fast (Eastern Orthodoxy) 
The Holy Maccabees
August 1 (Eastern Orthodox liturgics)
Earliest day on which August Bank Holiday (Ireland) can fall, while August 7 is the latest; celebrated on the first Monday of August.
Earliest day on which Civic Holiday can fall, while August 7 is the latest; celebrated on the first Monday of August. (Canada)
Earliest day on which Commerce Day, or Frídagur verslunarmanna, can fall, while August 7 is the latest; celebrated on the first Monday of August. (Iceland)
Earliest day on which Constitution Day (Cook Islands) can fall, while August 7 is the latest; celebrated on the first Monday of August.
Earliest day on which Farmers' Day can fall, while August 7 is the latest; celebrated on the first Monday of August. (Zambia)
Earliest day on which International Beer Day can fall, while August 7 is the latest; celebrated on the first Friday of August.
Earliest day on which Friendship Day can fall, while August 7 is the latest; celebrated on the first Sunday of August. (United States)
Earliest day on which Kadooment Day can fall, while August 7 is the latest; celebrated on the first Monday of August (Barbados)
Earliest day on which Labor Day (Samoa) can fall, while August 7 is the latest; celebrated on the first Monday of August (Samoa)
Minden Day (United Kingdom)
National Day, celebrates the independence of Benin from France in 1960.
National Day, commemorates Switzerland becoming a single unit in 1291.
Official Birthday and Coronation Day of the King of Tonga (Tonga)
Parents' Day (Democratic Republic of the Congo)
Statehood Day (Colorado)
Swiss National Day (Switzerland)
The beginning of autumn observances in the Northern hemisphere and spring observances in the Southern hemisphere (Neopagan Wheel of the Year):
Lughnasadh in the Northern hemisphere, Imbolc in the Southern hemisphere; traditionally begins on the eve of August 1. (Gaels, Ireland, Scotland, Neopagans)
Lammas (England, Scotland, Neopagans)
Pachamama Raymi (Quechuan in Ecuador and Peru)
The first day of Carnaval del Pueblo (Burgess Park, London, England)
Victory Day (Cambodia, Laos, Vietnam)
World Scout Scarf Day
Yorkshire Day (Yorkshire, England)

References

External links

 
 
 

Days of the year
August